Open-Mike with Mike Bullard was a Canadian late-night talk show which was broadcast live from 1997 to 2003 on CTV and on The Comedy Network in primetime. It was hosted by comedian Mike Bullard and initially taped at a studio at the back of Wayne Gretzky's restaurant in Toronto, Ontario before CTV moved the show to Toronto's historic Masonic Temple. Open Mike with Mike Bullard featured two or three panel guests and one musical or comedy performance nightly. The show's bandleader and musical director was Orin Isaacs.  Part of Bullard's comedic style was interacting with audience members during his opening monologue, often deriving humour from finding ways to poke fun at an audience member's expense.

In the summer of 2003, Bullard's contract with CTV expired. He did not like their practice of shutting the show down for summers; he knew that it interrupted his exposure and he did not like to see reruns that were dated. He signed a multi-year deal to start a new, similar show on Global called The Mike Bullard Show. The new show carried over many of the staff and sketches from Open-Mike and aired at the same time as his old show had but faltered in the ratings against CTV, which aired The Daily Show with Jon Stewart in the same time slot. The Mike Bullard Show was cancelled in 2004 after a run of 13 weeks.

Segments
"Open-Mike Viewer Of The Week" – Sean Tweedley would make fun of one of the viewers in the audience, but they would be given a digital camera as a prize.
"The Canadian Quiz" – The last guests would be asked three questions about Canada at the end of every show.  Officially, the guests were supposed to get all three questions right, but they usually ended up winning the prize regardless. As the segment was sponsored by Canadian Tire, the prize would usually be one of their exclusive products.
"The Insider" – An entertainment-themed monologue.
"Who The Hell Do You Think You Are, You Drunken Bastard?" – a game played at a local bar where the name of a celebrity would be taped on the head of each contestant.  They would be given three clues from Mike and had to use them to guess who they were.
"What did you buy at Canadian Tire and why?" – a crew member would visit the Canadian Tire across the street from the studio and ask shoppers when they left what they had bought and why.

Awards
The show won two Gemini Awards, Best Talk Information Series in 1999 and Best Music Variety Program Series in 2001. The show also won the 2000 Hugo Award (Gold Medal) for Best Talk Show at the Chicago International Television Festival. Bullard was also voted one of the top 10 Funniest Canadians in a nationwide poll by TV Guide in 2002.

References

External links
 

CTV Television Network original programming
1997 Canadian television series debuts
2003 Canadian television series endings
CTV Comedy Channel original programming
Television shows filmed in Toronto
1990s Canadian comedy television series
2000s Canadian comedy television series
Canadian late-night television programming
Television series by Bell Media
1990s Canadian television talk shows
2000s Canadian television talk shows
Television series by Insight Productions
Canadian Screen Award-winning television shows